Ghislaine Arabian (born August 1948) is a French chef. She received two stars from the Guide Michelin.

Early life
Ghislaine Arabian was born and raised in Croix in the department of Nord near Roubaix.

Career
She is a chef specializing in French and Flemish cuisine. From 1992 to 1998, she was chef at the Pavillon Ledoyen, the only woman at the time to have received two Michelin stars. In 2007, she became the owner of the restaurant Les Petites Sorcières in Paris.

Television
From 2010 to 2014, she has been a member of the jury in the French version of the cooking contest Top Chef.

References

External links 
 

1948 births
Living people
People from Croix, Nord
Chefs from Paris